International Union for the Scientific Study of Population is an international union for the study of human population, which was founded in 1928.

References

External links 

 Official website

International scientific organizations